Park Chan-yong (born 1 January 1980) is a Korean handball player who competed in the 2004 Summer Olympics and in the 2008 Summer Olympics.

References

External links

1980 births
Living people
South Korean male handball players
Olympic handball players of South Korea
Handball players at the 2004 Summer Olympics
Handball players at the 2008 Summer Olympics
21st-century South Korean people